Larry Dane Brimner (born November 5, 1949) is an American teacher, presenter, and writer of more than 150 children's books. They have ranged from fantasy-style stories for young children to non-fiction books for older children. Many of his books have civil rights themes; his book We Are One: The Story of Bayard Rustin won the Jane Addams Children's Book Award, in the "older children" category, in 2008. This was followed by Birmingham Sunday, which received the Orbis Pictus Honor Book Award in 2011 from the National Council for Teachers of English and the Eureka! Gold Award from the California Reading Association. His 2011 title, Black & White: The Confrontation between Reverend Fred L. Shuttlesworth and Eugene "Bull" Connor, was given the Carter G. Woodson Book Award (The National Council for the Social Studies) and named a Robert F. Sibert Honor Book (The Association for Library Service to Children/American Librarian Association). More recently, Brimner has turned to the migrant children he once taught with the publication of STRIKE! The Farm Workers' Fight for Their Rights (Calkins Creek Books), which received a starred review in Kirkus Reviews.

Background
Brimner was born in St. Petersburg, Florida at St. Anthony's Hospital. The hospital nuns beseeched his mother to name him. Not a Roman Catholic, his mother didn't understand the urgency. Finally, however, she relented, naming him Larry Dane. When a nun returned later with paperwork that indicated his name had been recorded as Lawrence Dane, his mother—who didn't suffer fools or mince words—gave the nun such a tongue lashing that she retreated out of the room and down the hall. His name recorded to reflect his mother's wishes, he has been Larry Dane ever since and has spent a lifetime explaining that he is no Lawrence. His father was a military officer and Brimner spent much of his childhood on Kodiak Island in Alaska. There was no television and only sporadic radio, and so his parents read to him a lot. By the age of four, he was living in a rural suburb of San Diego, California, where his father had been reassigned to command a ship. Brimner entered a momentary life of crime when he and a neighbor boy stole some apples from the orchard next door. Trouble and a spanking followed, and he decided crime was not for him. He attended San Diego State University, graduating in 1971 with a B.A. degree in British Literature. He earned an M.A. degree from San Diego State University in 1981. From 1974 to 1984, he was a writing and composition teacher at El Centro Union High School in El Centro, California, a desert farming community east of San Diego. He then went on to lecture at San Diego State University from 1984 to 1992  in the College of Education while pursuing a doctorate degree, before deciding to turn his attention to writing full-time. He has been a full-time freelance writer since 1985. He often visits schools to encourage and motivate young people to discover the sheer wonder waiting between a book's covers. He has been a visiting author or an author-in-residence at schools on three continents. He also speaks at conferences of educators or of his fellow writers.

Published Work
Brimner's first book was BMX Freestyle (1987) which received a Children's Choice award from the International Reading Association. At least three other of his books have won this award: Snowboarding (1998) and The Official M&M's Book of the Millennium (2000) and The Littlest Wolf (2002). Recent awards include the Teachers' Choice Award, Eureka! Silver Award, the Jane Addams Honor Book Award, the Norman A. Sugarman Award and Honor for Biography (Cleveland Public Library), Best Book for the Teen Age (New York Public Library), Best Children's Books of the Year List (Bank Street College), Junior Library Guild Selection, and others.

While in college, Brimner became aware that he was attracted to other men. He was unable to find objective information about gay issues, and under pressure from his parents, he went to a psychiatrist and underwent electroshock treatments. These experiences led to his 1995 book for gay and lesbian teenagers, Being Different, which he did as a favor to his editor, E. Russell Primm.

As of 2014, Cats!, an early-reader he did for Children's Press/Scholastic Library, has sold more than 300,000 copies and is still in print. A picture book about yuletide friendships, Merry Christmas, Old Armadillo, is a perennial favorite. It received a starred review from School Library Journal. Seeing two elderly women on their Harley Davidson motorcycles spawned Nana's Hog. Cory Coleman, Grade 2, a chapter book, looks back at an event from his childhood, as does Elliot Fry's Good-bye. Although he loves the tightness of the picture book format, it is his nonfiction, especially his social justice nonfiction, for which he is known.

Brimner lives in San Diego, California, but keeps a small writing studio in Tucson, Arizona.

See also

References

External links
 

1949 births
20th-century American male writers
20th-century American writers
21st-century American writers
American children's writers
Carter G. Woodson Book Award winners
American gay writers
Living people
San Diego State University alumni
Writers from St. Petersburg, Florida